Preajba may refer to several villages in Romania:

 Preajba, a village in Malu Mare Commune, Dolj County
 Preajba, a village in Poeni Commune, Teleorman County
 Preajba de Jos and Preajba de Pădure, villages in Teslui Commune, Dolj County
 Preajba Mare, a village in Târgu Jiu city, Gorj County